Cliff Clark (June 10, 1889 – February 8, 1953) was an American actor. He entered the film business in 1937 after a substantial stage career and appeared in over 200 Hollywood films. In the last years of his life, he also played in a number of television productions.

Clark mostly played minor supporting roles, a specialty of his were policemen, inspectors and sheriffs. He appeared in a recurring role as Inspector Donovan in the Falcon film series at RKO Pictures during the 1940s.

Selected filmography

Big Time or Bust (1933) - Carnival Barker (uncredited)
Mountain Music (1937) - Pretty Panther Medicine Show Proprietor
The Patient in Room 18 (1938) - Inspector Foley
Daredevil Drivers (1938) - Mr. McAullife
He Couldn't Say No (1938) - Auctioneer
Mr. Moto's Gamble (1938) - McGuire
Cocoanut Grove (1938) - Auctioneer (uncredited)
Speed to Burn (1938) - Auctioneer (uncredited)
The Crowd Roars (1938) - George James (uncredited)
Time Out for Murder (1938) - Det. Capt. Collins
Up the River (1938) - Warden Fowler (uncredited)
While New York Sleeps (1938) - Police Insp. Cliff Collins
Kentucky (1938) - Melish
They Made Me a Criminal (1939) - Manager
Honolulu (1939) - 1st Detective
Inside Story (1939) - Collins
Within the Law (1939) - McGuire
Calling Dr. Kildare (1939) - Detective Flaherty (uncredited)
It's a Wonderful World (1939) - Captain Haggerty
Young Mr. Lincoln (1939) - Sheriff Gil Billings (uncredited)
Miracles for Sale (1939) - Inspector Gavigan
Chicken Wagon Family (1939) - Horse Auctioneer (uncredited)
Torchy Blane... Playing with Dynamite (1939) - Mike Kelly
Dust Be My Destiny (1939) - First Detective (uncredited)
Fast and Furious (1939) - Sam Travers
Call a Messenger (1939) - Sgt. Harrison (uncredited)
Missing Evidence (1939) - Allen Jennings
Joe and Ethel Turp Call on the President (1939) - Garage Owner
Henry Goes Arizona (1939) - Theatrical Agent V. B. Carmady (uncredited)
Slightly Honorable  (1939) - Capt. Graves
Judge Hardy and Son (1939) - Officer Dan O'Shea (uncredited)
Invisible Stripes (1939) - Police Sergeant (uncredited)
The Man Who Wouldn't Talk (1940) - Ryan (uncredited)
Brother Rat and a Baby (1940) - Police Captain (uncredited)
The Grapes of Wrath (1940) - City Man
Dr. Ehrlich's Magic Bullet (1940) - Haupt (uncredited)
Honeymoon Deferred (1940) - Police Insp. Mathews
Castle on the Hudson (1940) - Prison Guard Sergeant (uncredited)
Double Alibi (1940) - Police Inspector Early
Three Cheers for the Irish (1940) - Mara
Women Without Names (1940) - Pete (uncredited)
Charlie Chan's Murder Cruise (1940) - Lt. Wilson (uncredited)
Gangs of Chicago (1940) - Detective (uncredited)
Murder in the Air (1940) - Police Chief at Morgue (uncredited)
Florian (1940) - Detective Joe (uncredited)
A Fugitive from Justice (1940) - Police Captain (uncredited)
You're Not So Tough (1940) - Sheriff Griswold (uncredited)
Cross-Country Romance (1940) - Police Capt. G.G. Burke
Maryland (1940) - Sheriff (uncredited)
Black Diamonds (1940) - Archie Connor
Stranger on the Third Floor (1940) - Martin
Brigham Young (1940) - Dissenter (uncredited)
Flowing Gold (1940) - Oil Well Shares Seller (uncredited)
Wagon Train (1940) - Matt Gardner
Knute Rockne All American (1940) - Danny - Post Office Paymaster (uncredited)
A Dispatch from Reuters (1940) - Reporter (uncredited)
Santa Fe Trail (1940) - Instructor (scenes deleted)
Western Union (1941) - Sheriff (uncredited)
Golden Hoofs (1941) - Booth
The Trial of Mary Dugan (1941) - John Dugan (uncredited)
The Sea Wolf (1941) - First Detective (uncredited)
Washington Melodrama (1941) - Simpson
Strange Alibi (1941) - Captain Reddick
The Wagons Roll at Night (1941) - Doc
Thieves Fall Out (1941) - Policeman (uncredited)
For Beauty's Sake (1941) - Police Lt. Doleman (uncredited)
Blondie in Society (1941) - Chief of Police (uncredited)
Manpower (1941) - Cully
Nine Lives Are Not Enough (1941) - Lieutenant Buckley
Honky Tonk (1941) - Dr. Otis (uncredited)
Mob Town (1941) - Captain Harrington - Police Chief (uncredited)
Law of the Tropics (1941) - Bartender
Dangerously They Live (1941) - John Dill
Babes on Broadway (1941) - Inspector Moriarity
Blue, White and Perfect (1942) - Inspector Peterson
A Yank on the Burma Road (1942) - Police Lieutenant (uncredited)
Wild Bill Hickok Rides (1942) - Vic Kersey
Jail House Blues (1942) - Warden Boswell
Joe Smith, American (1942) - Police Captain (uncredited)
Butch Minds the Baby (1942) - Police Captain (uncredited)
True to the Army (1942) - Circus Barker (uncredited)
Kid Glove Killer (1942) - Captain Lynch
Who Is Hope Schuyler? (1942) - Lt. Palmer
Fingers at the Window (1942) - Lt. Allison
Mokey (1942) - Mr. Graham
The Big Shot (1942) - Police Captain (uncredited)
Secret Enemies (1942) - Detective Capt. Jarrett
Henry Aldrich, Editor (1942) - Fire Chief
The Falcon's Brother (1942) - Inspector Timothy Donovan
Highways by Night (1942) - Police Captain James
Street of Chance (1942) - Ryan, (Policeman)
The Mummy's Tomb (1942) - Sheriff
Army Surgeon (1942) - Ship Captain (uncredited)
Madame Spy (1942) - Inspector Varden
USS VD: Ship of Shame (1942) - Margaret's Doctor (uncredited)
Tennessee Johnson (1942) - Delegate with Badge (uncredited)
Something to Shout About (1943) - Harrigan - Desk Sergeant (uncredited)
Ladies' Day (1942) - Dan Hannigan, Sox Manager
Keep 'Em Slugging (1943) - Macklin (uncredited)
Slightly Dangerous (1943) - Detective (uncredited)
The Falcon Strikes Back (1943) - Inspector Timothy Donovan
Taxi, Mister (1943) - Police Chief Jim (uncredited)
The Falcon in Danger (1943) - Inspector Timothy Donovan
Petticoat Larceny (1943) - Lieutenant Hackett
Destroyer (1943) - Commandant (uncredited)
The Falcon and the Co-eds (1943) - Inspector Timothy Donovan
There's Something About a Soldier (1943) - City Editor (uncredited)
Destination Tokyo (1943) - Hornet's Admiral (uncredited)
The Falcon Out West (1944) - Inspector Timothy Donovan
Andy Hardy's Blonde Trouble (1944) - Officer Shay (uncredited)
Once Upon a Time (1944) - Radio Car Cop (uncredited)
Song of the Open Road (1944) - Mr. Evans (uncredited)
Marine Raiders (1944) - Maj. Gen. Rider, Guadalcanal Marine Commander (uncredited)
Bride by Mistake (1944) - Navy Captain (uncredited)
Maisie Goes to Reno (1944) - Police Captain (uncredited)
In the Meantime, Darling (1944) - Col. Corkery
Barbary Coast Gent (1944) - Jack Coda
The Missing Juror (1944) - Inspector Davis (uncredited)
Nothing but Trouble (1944) - Police Sergeant (uncredited)
Escape in the Desert (1945) - Charlie, Gas Truck Driver (uncredited)
The Thirteenth Hour (1947) - Police Captain Linfield
Mr. District Attorney (1947) - Police Captain Lambert (uncredited)
Lost Honeymoon (1947) - Police Sergeant (uncredited)
Buck Privates Come Home (1947) - Quentin (INS) (uncredited)
 Philo Vance's Gamble (1947) - Inspector Walsh
The Corpse Came C.O.D. (1947) - City Editor Emmett Willard (uncredited)
Bury Me Dead (1947) - Archer, Detective
Cass Timberlane (1947) - Humbert Bellile (uncredited)
Roses Are Red (1947) - Police Capt. Sharkey (uncredited)
Her Husband's Affairs (1947) - Gus (uncredited)
It Had to Be You (1947) - Fire Chief (uncredited)
Albuquerque (1948) - Armin's Clerk (uncredited)
Alias a Gentleman (1948) - The Warden (uncredited)
Mr. Blandings Builds His Dream House (1948) - Jones (uncredited)
Fort Apache (1948) - Stage Driver (uncredited)
Smart Woman (1948) - Police Captain (uncredited)
The Fuller Brush Man (1948) - Cop in Park (uncredited)
Raw Deal (1948) - Gates
I, Jane Doe (1948) - City Editor (uncredited)
The Big Punch (1948) - Bartender George (uncredited)
Borrowed Trouble (1948) - Dink Davis
Deep Waters (1948) - Harris
The Babe Ruth Story (1948) - St. Louis Manager (uncredited)
Embraceable You (1948) - Honest Peterson (uncredited)
A Southern Yankee (1948) - Confederate Doctor (uncredited)
Hollow Triumph (1948) - Motorist (uncredited)
Sorry, Wrong Number (1948) - Police Sergeant Duffy (uncredited)
Good Sam (1948) - Probation Officer (scenes deleted)
False Paradise (1948) - Banker Waite
In This Corner (1948) - CPO Mike Burke
The Snake Pit (1948) - Shooting Gallery Proprietor (uncredited)
Trouble Makers (1948) - Police Captain Madison
Jiggs and Maggie in Court (1948) - Judge Wilson
Adventures of Gallant Bess (1948) - Sheriff
Force of Evil (1948) - Police Lieutenant (uncredited)
Shockproof (1949) - Mac - Police Lieutenant (uncredited)
The Crime Doctor's Diary (1949) - Police Insp. John D. Manning (uncredited)
Homicide (1949) - Capt. Mooney
The Stratton Story (1949) - Josh Higgins
Home of the Brave (1949) - Colonel Baker
Any Number Can Play (1949) - Gas Station Attendant (uncredited)
Mighty Joe Young (1949) - McManus - Police Guard Moran (uncredited)
Flaming Fury (1949) - Fire Engineer Robby Rollins
Post Office Investigator (1949) - Inspector Delany
Miss Grant Takes Richmond (1949) - Construction Materials Contractor (uncredited)
Roseanna McCoy (1949) - Sideshow Barker (uncredited)
Fighting Man of the Plains (1949) - Travers
Powder River Rustlers (1949) - Lucius Statton
Ambush (1950) - Capt. Harcourt (uncredited)
The Secret Fury (1950) - Police Capt. Arnold (uncredited)
Blondie's Hero (1950) - Police Officer (uncredited)
The Gunfighter (1950) - Jerry Marlowe (uncredited)
The Big Hangover (1950) - Albert Johnson (uncredited)
The Second Woman (1950) - Police Sergeant
The Men (1950) - Dr. Kameran
The Cariboo Trail (1950) - Assayer
Desperadoes of the West (1950, Serial) - Colonel Arnold
Vigilante Hideout (1950) - Howard Sanders
Rookie Fireman (1950) - Captain Mack Connors
The Fuller Brush Girl (1950) - Ship Captain (uncredited)
The Sun Sets at Dawn (1950) - Executioner (uncredited)
Southside 1-1000 (1950) - Deane's Guard on Train (uncredited)
The Sound of Fury (1950) - Sheriff Demig
Operation Pacific (1951) - Commander, SUBPAC
Sugarfoot (1951) - Rancher (uncredited)
The Great Missouri Raid (1951) - Railroad Engineer (uncredited)
Mr. Imperium (1951) - Restaurant Proprietor (uncredited)
Saddle Legion (1951) - Fred Warren
My Forbidden Past (1951) - Horse Vendor (uncredited)
Cavalry Scout (1951) - Colonel George Deering
Warpath (1951) - Bartender
Joe Palooka in Triple Cross (1951) - Sheriff Malin
Desert of Lost Men (1951) - Carl Landers
Silver City (1951) - Bartender (uncredited)
Overland Telegraph (1951) - Terence Muldoon
Scandal Sheet (1952) - Doc O'Hanlon (uncredited)
Phone Call from a Stranger (1952) - Watchman (uncredited)
High Noon (1952) - Ed Weaver (uncredited)
The Pride of St. Louis (1952) - Pittsburgh Coach (uncredited)
The Sniper (1952) - Chief of Police (uncredited)
The Sellout (1952) - Andy - Police Chief (uncredited)
Cripple Creek (1952) - Winfield Hatton (uncredited)
Carrie (1952) - Policeman (uncredited)
Francis Goes to West Point (1952) - Officer Baker (uncredited)
The Big Sky (1952) - Jailer (uncredited)
It Grows on Trees (1952) - Police Desk Sergeant Reilly (uncredited)
My Man and I (1952) - Bit Role (uncredited)
Hurricane Smith (1952) - Australian Policeman (uncredited)
Toughest Man in Arizona (1952) - Nathan Barlack (uncredited)
Sky Full of Moon (1952) - Agent at Train Stop (uncredited)
The War of the Worlds (1953) - Australian Policeman (scenes deleted)
South Sea Woman (1953) - Lt. Col. Parker (uncredited)
Houdini (1953) - Barker (uncredited)
Here Come the Girls (1953) - Hackenschmidt - Cabbie (uncredited)

References

External links

 

1889 births
1953 deaths
20th-century American male actors
American male film actors